The Glory Memorial is a former memorial located in Kutaisi, Georgia and designed by an architect Otar Kalandarishvili with participation of a sculptor-monumentalist Merab Berdzenishvili. It was dedicated to the memory of those who died during World War II and featured a soldier on a horse stabbing a German soldier with a spear, an allusion to St. George slaying a dragon. In 2009, the monument was demolished to make way for a new parliament building, killing two bystanders with falling debris. The monument was ordered demolished by then-President Mikheil Saakashvili.

The rebuilt Glory Memorial was unveiled in 2010 at a ceremony attended by Vladimir Putin and Georgian opposition leaders Nino Burjanadze and Zurab Noghaideli. Located on Moscow's Poklonnaya Hill, the memorial displays the words, "We were together in the struggle against fascism."

References

Military monuments and memorials
Monuments and memorials in Georgia (country)
Demolished buildings and structures in Georgia (country)
Buildings and structures in Kutaisi